Evergestis borregalis is a moth in the family Crambidae. It was described by Eugene G. Munroe in 1974. It is found in North America, where it has been recorded from California and New Mexico.

References

Evergestis
Moths described in 1974
Moths of North America